Paracassina is a genus of frogs in the family Hyperoliidae, sometimes known as common striped frogs. They are endemic to central Ethiopia.

Species
It contains the following species:
 Paracassina kounhiensis (Mocquard, 1905)
 Paracassina obscura (Boulenger, 1895)

References

 
Hyperoliidae
Amphibians of Sub-Saharan Africa
Endemic fauna of Ethiopia
Amphibian genera
Taxa named by Mario Giacinto Peracca
Taxonomy articles created by Polbot